Tarra may refer to:

People
 Tarra White (born 1987), actress

Places
 Tarra-Bulga National Park, a national park in Victoria, Australia
 Tarra, Crete (also "Tarrha"), an ancient city of western Crete
 Tarra River (Colombia), a tributary of the Catatumbo River
 Tarra River (Victoria)
 El Tarra, a municipality in Colombia

See also
 Tharros, an ancient city in Sardinia
 Tarras, New Zealand